Pax Romana is a creator-owned four-issue limited series comic book written and illustrated by Jonathan Hickman and published by Image Comics on March 7, 2012.

Plot
Vatican-backed research has discovered the secret of time travel. With it the Church plans to fix the future by altering the past. They send a warehouse of modern weaponry and enhanced soldiers to Rome in 312 CE. Plans change quickly as the cardinal in charge of the mission is shot.

Collected editions

Adaptation
In April 2014, Syfy announced to adapt Pax Romana into a miniseries. Matthew Federman and Stephen Scaia (Warehouse 13) were hired as the writers of the show, with Scaia and David Alpert (The Walking Dead) as executive producers and Hickman as a co-executive producer. No new details of the project were moving forward after its initial announcement.

Characters
Nicholas Chase A retired American general who is sent with Cardinal Beppi Pelle on a mission from the Pope to change history and right the wrongs of modern humanity by ensuring that the Catholic Church reigns supreme.

Gene Pope Pope who tells the young Holy Roman Emperor the story of how the empire has lasted for so many centuries.

Beppi Pelle Cardinal chosen to be sent back in time to make sure the Catholic Church retains supremacy.

Constantine Constantine was the first Christian emperor of Rome and considered within the story to be the last effective ruler of Rome.

References

Interviews
 Hickman Saves the Future, Destroys the Past in "Pax Romana", Comic Book Resources, October 16, 2007

Reviews
 Jonathan Hickman: The Design of Things to Come, Ain't It Cool News, January 9, 2008

External links
Foreword and preview of the collected edition

Comics by Jonathan Hickman
Comics about time travel
Science fiction comics
Action comics